Daguerréotypes is a 1976 French documentary by Agnès Varda. It features vignettes of life in Rue Daguerre - a street in Paris, where the filmmaker lived.

Varda was caring for her two-year-old son at the time of filming and could not spend long periods away from her home. Because of this, the entire film is confined within a  radius of Varda's home - the length of the electric cables for her equipment.

Most of those profiled come from places outside Paris, or even France. Over the course of the film, every subject is asked the same three questions: "Where did you come from?", "When did you get here?", "Why did you come?".

The film's name is a complex pun: The street, Rue Daguerre, is named after Louis Daguerre, inventor of the Daguerreotypes method of photographic printing. During a voiceover in the film, Varda explains that the business owners and occupants of Rue Daguerre are her 'types', in reference to typologies both as the photographic style and practices of social classification that Varda was critical of. At various points the subjects assume formal, static pose as if in mid-19th century photo portraiture.

References

External links

French documentary films
Films directed by Agnès Varda
Films set in Paris
1976 documentary films
1976 films
1970s French-language films
1970s French films